Hot Rap Songs is a record chart published by the music industry magazine Billboard that ranks the most popular hip hop songs in the United States. 77 songs topped Hot Rap Songs in the 2010s. The first number-one song of the decade was "Empire State of Mind" by Jay-Z featuring Alicia Keys. In 2012, Drake broke the record for the most Hot Rap Songs number-one songs, previously held by Diddy. During the 2010s, Drake spent the most weeks at number one and attained the most number-one songs on Hot Rap Songs, with 19 chart-toppers spanning 118 weeks. In 2019, "Old Town Road" by Lil Nas X featuring Billy Ray Cyrus spent a record-breaking 20 weeks atop Hot Rap Songs. The final number-one song of the decade on the chart was "Roxanne" by Arizona Zervas.

At the start of the decade the chart was airplay-based, with rankings based on each track's estimated audience as monitored by Nielsen Broadcast Data Systems from a panel of 134 radio stations. In October 2012, Billboard altered the chart's methodology to include digital download sales and streaming data. Under the new methodology, the Rap Songs chart became a distillation of the main Billboard Hot R&B/Hip-Hop Songs chart, which according to the magazine "highlight[s] the differences between pure R&B and rap titles in the overall, wide-ranging R&B/hip-hop field." "Gangnam Style" by Psy was the first number-one song to benefit from these changes, ascending from number 20 to the top spot on the chart dated October 20, 2012.

The changes were met with controversy, with critics arguing that the new chart failed to take into account R&B and rap music's traditionally African-American demographic. Psy's climb to number one in particular was also criticized, with Ebro Darden, program director of New York City radio station WQHT, arguing: "Trust me when I tell you hip-hop does not consider Psy rap. Billboard has pull, but they cannot make people who live hip-hop believe Psy is rap." In response, Billboard chart director Bill Werde defended the changes as a necessary means of reflecting consumer tastes on genre charts. In a 25th anniversary listing of the top 100 songs in the history of Hot Rap Songs based on chart performance, Macklemore and Ryan Lewis' 2013 15-week number-one single "Thrift Shop" was ranked at number one, thanks in part to the new methodology.

Number-one songs

References

External links
 Hot Rap Songs at Billboard

Lists of number-one rap songs in the United States
United States rap singles
2010s in hip hop music